Stephen Mark Carton (born ) is a former New Zealand racing cyclist who won a bronze medal competing for his country at the 1982 Commonwealth Games.

Born in 1961 or 1962, Carton grew up in Lower Hutt. At the 1982 Commonwealth Games, he was a member of the New Zealand team in the 100 km team time trial with Stephen Cox, Blair Stockwell, and Jack Swart. During the event, Carton's chain jammed and the other three riders completed the course together, finishing third.

Carton later moved to Melbourne, Australia, to live.

References

1960s births
Living people
Sportspeople from Lower Hutt
New Zealand male cyclists
Commonwealth Games bronze medallists for New Zealand
Cyclists at the 1982 Commonwealth Games
Commonwealth Games medallists in cycling
Medallists at the 1982 Commonwealth Games